Kuchumba may refer to:

Kuchumba, alternate spelling of Kachumba, a creek and plain in South Australia

See also
Kuchuma
Kombucha